San Isidro, officially the Municipality of San Isidro, is a 3rd class municipality in the province of Davao Oriental, Philippines. According to the 2020 census, it has a population of 33,664 people.

San Isidro is one of the "gulf towns" of Davao Oriental whose shorelines stretch along Davao Gulf. Other gulf towns are Banaybanay, Lupon and Governor Generoso.

History
The town of San Isidro was created by virtue of Republic Act No. 4744 enacted by the Philippine Congress on June 18, 1966. It started operating as a local government unit in January 1968. Its founder and the first mayor was Vicente Yu, Sr.

Geography

Climate

Barangays
San Isidro is politically subdivided into 16 barangays. Seven barangays are along the coastlines while the other nine are in the interior areas.

Demographics

Around 30% of the population belong to the indigenous Mandaya and Kalagan communities.

Economy

San Isidro is largely planted with coconut, with much of its agricultural industry focuses on the production of copra. There are currently efforts to further diversify the output of the municipality's coconut-based industry from copra to other value-added coconut products such as coco-oil (which can be used as a fuel additive) and coco-coir. In 1992, a Crop Diversification Program of the local government unit (LGU) was implemented with mango as "export winner". In 1998, the town commenced its first Mango Festival as an indicator of the prominence of this high yielding fruit. Farmers are also engaged in growing the popular banana (cardava). Despite this, farmers still experience difficulties in increasing their income due to lack of agricultural technology specially those farming in the upland areas.

The aggressive anti-illegal fishing efforts of the LGU decreased dynamite fishing and able to establish fish sanctuaries in San Isidro waters. Most of the fishermen in this town used paddle-boat than motorized boat in fishing.

Tourism
The municipality's seascape offers potential marine-based recreational industries on the as yet virtually undisturbed Tinaytay and Burias reefs a few kilometers offshore. In addition, its scenic nature spots include beaches untouched by urban development; the cascading Cawa-cawa Stepped Falls, and the 12 km2 Pygmy or Bonsai forests in the thickly forested highlands of the municipality.

Mount Hamiguitan Range Wildlife Sanctuary

One of the tourist spots easily accessible from San Isidro is the Mount Hamiguitan Range Wildlife Sanctuary. It is a UNESCO World Heritage Site as it currently serves as the habitat of different endangered species of flora and fauna. What makes it an even more critical habitat for these plants and animals is that eight of those threatened species are only found at Mount Hamiguitan. Endangered species in the site include the Philippine eagle and Philippine cockatoo.

References

External links
   San Isidro Profile at the DTI Cities and Municipalities Competitive Index
 [ Philippine Standard Geographic Code]
 Philippine Census Information
 Local Governance Performance Management System

Municipalities of Davao Oriental